Star of Texas is a 1953 American Western film directed by Thomas Carr and starring Wayne Morris, Paul Fix and Frank Ferguson.

Plot

Cast
 Wayne Morris as Texas Ranger Ed Ryan / Robert Larkin  
 Paul Fix as Luke Andrews  
 Frank Ferguson as Marshal Bullock  
 Rick Vallin as Texas Ranger William Vance  
 Jack Larson as Henchman John Jenkins  
 James Flavin as Texas Rangers Capt. Sturdivant  
 William Fawcett as Soapy  
 Robert Bice as Henchman Al Slade  
 Mickey Simpson as Henchman Tom Traynor  
George Wallace  as Clampett
 John Crawford as Texas Ranger Stockton  
 Stanley Price as Hank Caldwell / James Lawrence  
 Lyle Talbot as Telegraph Operator

References

Bibliography
 Martin, Len D. The Allied Artists Checklist: The Feature Films and Short Subjects of Allied Artists Pictures Corporation, 1947-1978. McFarland & Company, 1993.

External links
 

1953 films
1953 Western (genre) films
American Western (genre) films
Films directed by Thomas Carr
Allied Artists films
Films set in Texas
Films set in the 19th century
Films scored by Raoul Kraushaar
American black-and-white films
1950s English-language films
1950s American films